Zebinella striatocostata is a species of minute sea snail, a marine gastropod mollusk or micromollusk in the family Rissoinidae.

Description
The size of the shell varies between 4 mm and 6 mm.

Distribution
This species occurs in the Caribbean Sea and the Gulf of Mexico; in the Atlantic Ocean off Brazil.

References

 Guppy, R.J.L. & Dall, W.H. (1896) Descriptions of Tertiary fossils from the Antillean region. Proceedings of the United States National Museum, 19, 303–331, pls. 27–30 page(s): 322
 Rosenberg, G., F. Moretzsohn, and E. F. García. 2009. Gastropoda (Mollusca) of the Gulf of Mexico, Pp. 579–699 in Felder, D.L. and D.K. Camp (eds.), Gulf of Mexico–Origins, Waters, and Biota. Biodiversity. Texas A&M Press, College Station, Texas.
 Faber M.J. & Moolenbeek R.G. (2013) Two new species of Rissoinidae from Guadeloupe (Gastropoda: Rissooidea). Miscellanea Malacologica 6(1): 9-14.

Rissoinidae
Gastropods described in 1842
Molluscs of the Atlantic Ocean
Molluscs of Brazil